Martha Elizabeth "Libba" Bray (March 11, 1964) is an American writer of young adult novels including the Gemma Doyle Trilogy, Going Bovine, and The Diviners.

Early life
Martha Elizabeth Bray was born in Montgomery, Alabama. Her father was a gay Presbyterian minister, and her mother was an English teacher.

She and her family moved to West Virginia for a brief period, then to Corpus Christi, Texas and finally to Denton, Texas, where Bray attended high school. At the age of eighteen, three weeks after graduating high school, Bray was involved in a serious car accident. She had to undergo thirteen surgeries over six years to reconstruct her face, and has an artificial left eye because of the accident.

Bray graduated from the University of Texas at Austin in 1988 as a Theatre major. As a budding playwright, she felt it important to be in New York City. When her childhood best friend, already living in Manhattan, called saying she was looking for a roommate, Bray moved to New York.

Bray is married to Barry Goldblatt, a children's book agent, and the couple have a son, Josh.

Career
Bray's first job was in the publicity department of Penguin Putnam, followed by three years at Spier, an advertising agency specializing in book advertising.

Bray was encouraged to write a young adult novel by her husband, Barry Goldblatt, a children's book agent and Ginee Seo, an editor at Simon & Schuster. Before this, using a pseudonym, she had written three books for 17th Street Press (a publisher of romances).

Her first novel, A Great and Terrible Beauty became a New York Times bestseller. In November 2006, a video promoting the book was a part of The Book Standard's Teen Book Video Awards. She wrote two more books to finish the trilogy she had started with A Great and Terrible Beauty: Rebel Angels and The Sweet Far Thing.

Bray is friends with many young adult authors such as John Green and Maureen Johnson, and with fellow YA fantasy authors Holly Black and Cassandra Clare. Her blog can be read on https://web.archive.org/web/20101023044746/http://libba-bray.livejournal.com/.

Going Bovine was published by Delacorte in 2009 and won the annual Michael L. Printz Award from the American Library Association recognizing literary excellence in young adult literature. It is a dark comedy about a 16-year-old boy named Cameron who has mad cow disease and a 16-year-old dwarf named Gonzo whom he met in the hospital. Gonzo is a video gamer who thinks that everything is trying to kill him. Cameron has visitation from a punkish angel named Dulcie who has a propensity for spray-painting her wings. They are all on a mission to cure Cameron's mad cow disease.

Beauty Queens, about a group of beauty pageant contestants whose plane crashes on an island, was published by Scholastic Press on May 24, 2011.

Bray's novel, The Diviners, was published on September 18, 2012. It centers around Evie O'Neill, a seventeen-year-old with a special power who has been sent to live with her uncle in New York City in 1926. The sequel, Lair of Dreams, was released in August 2015 and the third book, Before The Devil Breaks You, was released in October 2017. The fourth and final book in the series, The King of Crows, was released in February 2020.

Awards and honors

Awards

Honors 
A Great and Terrible Beauty, The Sweet Far Thing, received starred reviews from Publishers Weekly. Going Bovine received starred reviews from Booklist and Publishers Weekly. Before the Devil Breaks You and the audiobook renditions of Beauty Queens and The King of Crows received starred reviews from Booklist. The Diviners received starred reviews from Booklist, Kirkus Reviews, and Publishers Weekly. Lair of Dreams received starred reviews from Kirkus Reviews and Publishers Weekly.

A Great and Terrible Beauty, Rebel Angels, The Sweet Far Thing were national best sellers for children's fiction.

Publications

Gemma Doyle trilogy

The Diviners series

Standalone novels
Going Bovine, Delacorte (2009)
Beauty Queens, Scholastic Press (2011)

Anthologized short stories
21 Proms, Scholastic Paperbacks (2007)
The Restless Dead, Candlewick Press (2007)
Up All Night, HarperTeen (2008)
Vacations from Hell, HarperTeen (2009)
"The Thirteenth Step", a short story in The Eternal Kiss: 13 Vampire Tales of Blood and Desire, ed. Trisha Telep, Running Press (2009)
"The Last Ride of the Glory Girls," Steampunk! An Anthology of Fantastically Rich and Stories (2015)

See also

References

External links

 
Live Journal fan site
Video for A Great and Terrible Beauty

 The Diviners (official)
 

1964 births
Living people
21st-century American novelists
American fantasy writers
American women novelists
American young adult novelists
Michael L. Printz Award winners
Novelists from Alabama
Place of birth missing (living people)
Women science fiction and fantasy writers
21st-century American women writers
Women writers of young adult literature
People from Denton, Texas
Writers from Montgomery, Alabama
Novelists from Texas